The Jolts are a Canadian punk rock group formed in Vancouver, British Columbia in 2004 with a focus on playing relentless high-energy classic 1970s style punk rock.

Members of the band also moonlight as a Ramones tribute band called The Ramores.

History
The Jolts were formed by Joey Blitzkrieg and Dylan Danger in early 2004.  After positive reviews of their 2006 EP Jinx, they recorded a track (Rambo Rat) for a Queers tribute album called God Save The Queers.  While recording the cover track GT Flare was replaced by former The Spinoffs drummer Matt Dander, the band citing "creative differences".

In 2008 The Jolts self-released their first full-length album Haute Voltage featuring 11 tracks, including a re-recorded version of Bloody Eye Socket, one of the more popular tracks from The Jinx EP. Shortly after the release of Haute Voltage Lektor Kurrentz left the band to focus on his other project, The Isotopes.  The Jolts acquired bassist Joshy Atomic, who had been playing in The Cheats and Sound City Hooligans.

In late 2009 The Jolts recorded 4 songs that were released on two 7" records. Born Speedin b/w Gimme gasoline was released on Edmonton's Eat Shit and Die Records and Kaminari Lovers b/w Loser(Baby I'm A) was co-released by American/UK labels Meaty Beaty and No Front Teeth.

After recording another album with producer Jesse Gander in 2010, Dylan Danger left the band to pursue his solo career (as Dylan Thomas Rysstad) and the band shifted Atomic to lead guitar duties while recruiting Matt Snakes of Battle Snakes as the new bass player. That album was released in July 2011 as "Eight Percent" and is being distributed by Sudden Death Records.

Since 2006 The Jolts have been on a series of cross-Canada tours supporting each successive release, and are continuing to impress audiences across the country.

Members
Main lineup
 Joey Blitzkrieg – Vocals & Guitar
 Joshy Atomic – Lead Guitar
 Matt L. Snakes – Bass
 Matt Dander – Drums & Percussion

Discography
Albums
Haute Voltage 2008
Eight Percent 2011
No Paradoxes 2016

EPs & Singles
Jinx (5 track EP) 2006
Born Speedin/Gimme Gasoline (7" single) 2009
Kaminari Lovers (7" single) 2010
"Hammer Every Nail" (7" single) 2013

Music Videos

Compilations
God Save The Queers (The Queers tribute album) 2008

References

External links
 Official website

Canadian punk rock groups
Musical groups established in 2004
Musical groups from Vancouver
2004 establishments in British Columbia